Myrtletown is a census-designated place (CDP) in Humboldt County, California, United States.  Myrtletown lies at an elevation of 112 feet (34 m). Myrtletown is a part of the Eureka, California metropolitan area. The population was 4,675 at the 2010 census, up from 4,459 at the 2000 census.

Geography

Climate 
Myrtletown enjoys a mild, temperate cool-summer Mediterranean climate (Köppen Csb).

Demographics

2010
The 2010 United States Census reported that Myrtletown had a population of 4,675. The racial makeup of Myrtletown was 3,969 (84.9%) White, 53 (1.1%) African American, 142 (3.0%) Native American, 155 (3.3%) Asian, 19 (0.4%) Pacific Islander, 126 (2.7%) from other races, and 211 (4.5%) from two or more races. Hispanic or Latino of any race were 387 persons (8.3%).

The Census reported that 4,475 people (95.7% of the population) lived in households, 106 (2.3%) lived in non-institutionalized group quarters, and 94 (2.0%) were institutionalized.

There were 1,992 households, out of which 496 (24.9%) had children under the age of 18 living in them, 777 (39.0%) were opposite-sex married couples living together, 192 (9.6%) had a female householder with no husband present, 109 (5.5%) had a male householder with no wife present.  There were 158 (7.9%) unmarried opposite-sex partnerships, and 24 (1.2%) same-sex married couples or partnerships. 713 households (35.8%) were made up of individuals, and 319 (16.0%) had someone living alone who was 65 years of age or older. The average household size was 2.25.  There were 1,078 families (54.1% of all households); the average family size was 2.89.

The population was spread out, with 914 people (19.6%) under the age of 18, 414 people (8.9%) aged 18 to 24, 1,169 people (25.0%) aged 25 to 44, 1,205 people (25.8%) aged 45 to 64, and 973 people (20.8%) who were 65 years of age or older.  The median age was 41.3 years. For every 100 females, there were 89.1 males.  For every 100 females age 18 and over, there were 86.7 males.

The homeowner vacancy rate was 0.9%; the rental vacancy rate was 3.5%.  2,413 people (51.6% of the population) lived in owner-occupied housing units and 2,062 people (44.1%) lived in rental housing units.

2000
As of the census of 2000, there were 4,459 people, 1,738 households, and 1,119 families residing in the CDP. The racial makeup of the CDP was 89.35% White, 0.78% Black or African American, 2.85% Native American, 1.39% Asian, 0.07% Pacific Islander, 1.12% from other races, and 4.44% from two or more races.  4.58% of the population were Hispanic or Latino of any race.

There were 1,738 households, out of which 31.1% had children under the age of 18 living with them, 47.8% were married couples living together, 11.5% had a female householder with no husband present, and 35.6% were non-families. 27.6% of all households were made up of individuals, and 11.0% had someone living alone who was 65 years of age or older.  The average household size was 2.42 and the average family size was 2.92.

In the CDP, the population was spread out, with 23.5% under the age of 18, 8.0% from 18 to 24, 27.1% from 25 to 44, 22.7% from 45 to 64, and 18.6% who were 65 years of age or older.  The median age was 39 years. For every 100 females, there were 86.4 males.  For every 100 females age 18 and over, there were 82.5 males.

The median income for a household in the CDP was $37,417, and the median income for a family was $43,250. Males had a median income of $32,500 versus $22,161 for females. The per capita income for the CDP was $19,057.  About 14.4% of families and 13.3% of the population were below the poverty line, including 25.2% of those under age 18 and 6.4% of those age 65 or over.

Architecture
Myrtletown is known for having a high concentration of homes built by the Pierson Building Company, a local builder of mass-produced homes, which were primarily produced in the 1950s and 1960s. These homes form a unique Pierson style characterized by low-pitched roofs, floor-to-ceiling picture windows, and open, central floor plans.
The periphery areas of Myrtletown primarily contain houses built in the latter half of the 20th century. However, several houses exist from the 1930s and 40s, when the area was grassy and open.

Politics

See also

References

External links
Myrtletown Community Site

Eureka, California
Census-designated places in Humboldt County, California
Census-designated places in California